The FC Basel 1917–18 season was their twentyfifth season since the club's foundation on 15 November 1893. FC Basel played their home games in the Landhof in the district Wettstein in Kleinbasel. The club's chairman was Franz Rinderer and in 1917 he was elected as president of the Swiss Football Association.

Overview 
Before the first World War came to an end, over 420,000 square meters of the total of 920,000 square meters of Swiss footballs field had been converted into potato fields. In 1913 FCB founded an athletics section, in 1915 their youth football section, Therefore the club fought hard to keep their ground Landhof. In 1917 the club organised the Swiss athletic championships in their grounds. The first nine championships, in the years 1906 to 1916 (1914–15 was canceled) were all held in French-speaking Switzerland. 1917 was the first time that the championships were held in the German-speaking region. The event was a success, 17 clubs and over 100 athletics took part and it attracted about 4,000 spectators.

The football team played a total of 23 matches in the 1917–18 season. 12 of these were in the domestic league and 10 were friendly matches. Of these friendlies six were won, one was drawn and three ended in a defeat. There were six home fixtures played in the Landhof and three away games. Three of these games were played in the Basel championship against the two other local teams Old Boys and Nordstern Basel. The away game in the Basel championship against the Old Boys was postponed and awarded 3–0 to the opponents.

The domestic league, Swiss Serie A 1917–18, was divided into three regional groups, an east, a central and a west. Basel and the two other local teams were allocated to the central group which had just seven teams, as opposed to the other two groups which both had eight teams. Baden could not participate because their field was used for agricultural purposes due to the war. The other teams playing in the Central group were FC Bern, Young Boys Bern, Biel-Bienne and Aarau. Basel played a good season, suffering only two defeats. They ended the season in second position with 17 points. In their 12 games Basel scored 31 goals and conceded 19. Karl Wüthrich and Otto Kuhn were jointly the team's best goal scorers both netting four times. Looking at things from the local point of view, Basel took three point from the two games against Nordstern Basel and won both of their games against Old Boys.

The Old Boys were in last position in the central group league table, but during the period of World War I there was not relegation/promotion between the Serie A and Serie B. The Young Boys won the group and continued to the finals. In the finals YB beat St. Gallen 2–1 but were defeated 2–4 by Servette, who thus won the Swiss championship.

Players 
Squad members

Results 

Legend

Friendly matches

Pre- and mid-season

Second half of season

Serie A

Central Group results

Central Group league table 

NB: Baden could not participate because their field was used for agricultural purposes due to the war.

See also
 History of FC Basel
 List of FC Basel players
 List of FC Basel seasons

References

Sources 
 Rotblau: Jahrbuch Saison 2014/2015. Publisher: FC Basel Marketing AG. 
 Die ersten 125 Jahre. Publisher: Josef Zindel im Friedrich Reinhardt Verlag, Basel. 
 FCB team 1916–17 at fcb-archiv.ch
 Switzerland 1917-18 at RSSSF

External links
 FC Basel official site

FC Basel seasons
Basel